Valeriy Petrovych Horbunov (13 November 1953 – 1996) was a Ukrainian and Soviet football player.

Honours
 Soviet Cup: 1980
 UEFA European Under-23 Football Championship: 1976

International career
Horbunov played his only game for USSR on 6 September 1978 in a friendly against Iran.

References
  Profile

External links
 

1953 births
1996 deaths
People from Horlivka
Soviet footballers
Soviet Union international footballers
Ukrainian footballers
Soviet Top League players
Soviet First League players
FC Shakhtar Donetsk players
FC Shakhtar Horlivka players
Association football defenders
Sportspeople from Donetsk Oblast